Ed Boyd is a guitarist from Bath, England. He is the current guitarist for Lúnasa, but is best known as a longtime member of the Celtic folk group Flook. He has also played in the group Red Ciel, and accompanied artists such as Kate Rusby, Karen Matheson and Michael McGoldrick.

More recently he has released an album with Celtic-Bluesgrass band The Scoville Units and continues to play with a multitude of bands including Cara Dillon, the Mike McGoldrick Band and Guidewires.

He is a regular tutor at Burwell Bash.

References

External links 
Flook

Year of birth missing (living people)
Living people
People educated at Beechen Cliff School
British folk guitarists
British male guitarists
Lúnasa (band) members
Flook (band) members